KMCX-FM (106.5 FM) is a radio station broadcasting a Country format. Licensed to Ogallala, Nebraska, United States, the station serves the North Platte area and is owned by iHeartMedia.

History
The station was assigned the call letters KMCX on May 22, 1980.  On March 30, 1982, the station changed its call sign to the current KMCX-FM. 
On December 23, 2004, the station was sold to Capstar TX Limited Partnership, a subsidiary of Clear Channel Communications (now iHeartMedia).

References

External links
 

MCX-FM
IHeartMedia radio stations